Mort Mills (born Mortimer Morris Kaplan; January 11, 1919 – June 6, 1993) was an American film and television actor who had roles in over 150 movies and television episodes.  He was often the town lawman or the local bad guy in many popular westerns of the 1950s and 1960s.

From 1957–1959 he had a recurring co-starring role as Marshal Frank Tallman in Man Without a Gun.  Other recurring roles were as Sergeant Ben Landro in the Perry Mason series and Sheriff Fred Madden in The Big Valley. He played villainous character "Red Scanlon" in an episode of Maverick opposite James Garner titled "Day of Reckoning" in 1957. The following year, he guest starred as a particularly greedy bounty hunter who clashes with Steve McQueen's character Josh Randall in the CBS western series, Wanted: Dead or Alive.

Biography
During World War II Mills served in the 3rd Marine Parachute Battalion in the Pacific.

Though Mills did much television work, he also found regular work in motion pictures. He is probably best known as the suspicious highway patrolman who follows Marion Crane (Janet Leigh) in Alfred Hitchcock's classic thriller Psycho (1960). A few years later, he worked again with Hitchcock, playing a spy in East Germany under the cover of being a farmer in Hitchcock's Torn Curtain (1966) starring Paul Newman and Julie Andrews. Mills also appeared with Charlton Heston in Orson Welles's suspense classic Touch of Evil (1958).

In 1955, he appeared as Samuel Mason on ABC's Disneyland miniseries Davy Crockett starring Fess Parker. From 1957–1959, Mills co-starred with Rex Reason in the syndicated western series Man Without a Gun.  He portrayed Marshal Frank Tallman. Reason played his friend, Adam MacLean, editor of the Yellowstone Sentinel newspaper. He appeared as villains twice in Maverick, first in 1957 with James Garner as Bret Maverick ("Day of Reckoning") and second in 1961 with Robert Colbert as Bret's brother Brent Maverick ("Benefit of Doubt"). In 1961 he appeared as Jack Saunders in the TV western Lawman in the episode titled "Owny O'Reilly." In the 1965 Three Stooges film, The Outlaws Is Coming, Mills played Trigger Mortis.

Mills was a regular as police Lieutenant Bob Malone in Howard Duff's NBC-Four Star Television series, Dante (1960–1961), set at a San Francisco, California, nightclub called "Dante's Inferno". He appeared in eight episodes of Perry Mason, seven of them as Police Sgt. Ben Landro between 1961 and 1965.

His cousin, Mary Treen, was a film actress.

Acting roles

Starring in his own TV series

Man Without a Gun  (23 episodes, 1957–59) as Marshal Frank Tallman

Recurring role in a series

Perry Mason as Sgt. Ben Landro
"The Case of the Difficult Detour" (1961)
"The Case of the Pathetic Patient" (1961)
"The Case of the Brazen Bequest" (1961)
"The Case of the Crippled Cougar" (1962)
"The Case of the Playboy Pugilist" (1962)
"The Case of the Fickle Filly" (1962)
"The Case of the Golden Venom" (1965)

also "The Case of the Slandered Submarine" (1960) as Barry Scott

The Big Valley as Sheriff Fred Madden
"The Murdered Party" (1965)
"Earthquake!" (1965)
"My Son, My Son" (1965)
"The Odyssey of Jubal Tanner" (1965)
"The Young Marauders" (1965)
"Hazard" (1966)

Multiple appearances on a television series

The Ford Television Theatre
"Crossed and Double Crossed" (1952) as Barfly
"Sudden Silence" (1956) The Deputy
"The Cisco Kid
"Sky Sign" (1954) as Carver
"Marriage by Mail" (1954) as Professor
"Arroyo Millionaire's Castle" (1955) as Sheriff Tom Roscoe
"Cisco and the Tappers" (1955) as Bart Stevens
Walt Disney's Wonderful World of Color
"Davy Crockett and the River Pirates" (1955) as Samuel Mason
"Davy Crockett's Keelboat Race" (1955) as Samuel Mason
Texas John Slaughter: "Ambush in Laredo" (1958)
Cheyenne
"Star in the Dust" (1956) as Mike
"Johnny Bravo" (1956) as Ben Taggart
"Incident at Dawson Flats" (1961) as Sherriff Graves
The Hardy Boys: The Mystery of the Applegate Treasure
"Never Say Die" (1956) as Policeman
"The Tower's Secret" (1956) as Policeman
"The Final Search" (1956) as Policeman
The 20th Century Fox Hour
"Gun in His Hand" (1956) as Joe Kirby
"End of a Gun" (1957) as 1st Brother
Gunsmoke
"No Handcuffs" (1956) as August Brake
"How to Die for Nothing" (1956) as Howard Bulow
"Born to Hang" (1957) as Robie
"Murder Warrant" (1959) as Jake Harbin
"Take Her, She's Cheap" (1964) as Loren Billings
"Death Train" (1967) as Jack Maple
Broken Arrow
"Black Moment" (1957) as Halley
"Legacy of a Hero" (1957) as Connell
Dick Powell's Zane Grey Theatre
"Time of Decision" (1957) as Bart Miller
"Man on the Run" (1957) as Pete Bostwick
"The Scar" (1961) as Foreman
Trackdown
"The San Saba Incident" (1957) as Ike Collins
"Bad Judgment" (1959) as Rafe Borden
The Life and Legend of Wyatt Earp
"The Vultures" (1957) as Sam Watts
"The Fanatic" (1960) as Odie Cairns
Wanted: Dead or Alive
"The Bounty" (1958) as Clark Daimler
"Eight Cent Reward" (1958) as Harmon Stone
"Railroaded" (1959) as Ed Bruner
"The Healing Woman" (1959) as Tom Summers
"Most Beautiful Woman" (1960) as Frank
Wagon Train
"The Jesse Cowan Story" (1958) as Bob Cowan
"The Clay Shelby Story" (1964) as Sgt. Bragan
"The Jarbo Pierce Story" (1965) as Grant
The Rifleman
"The Sister" (1958) as Joshua Snipe
"Jealous Man" (1962) as Owens

Maverick
"Day of Reckoning" (1958) as Red Scanlon
"Benefit of Doubt" (1961) as McGaven
Bronco
"The Long Ride Back" (1958) as Jacob Stint
"Apache Treasure" (1960) as Hickins
Sugarfoot
"Man Wanted" (1958) as Smiley
"Journey to Provision" (1960) as Sheriff Len Gogarty
Bonanza
"Vendetta" (1959) as Carl Morgan
"Day of the Dragon" (1961) as Gordon
"The Miracle Maker" (1962) as Thorne
"Song in the Dark" (1963) as Deputy Sheriff Jeff Sykes
"Joe Cartwright, Detective" (1967) as  Harry Perkins
The Untouchables
"The Dutch Schultz Story" (1959) as Lulu Rosenkrantz
"Takeover" (1962) as Woody O'Mara
Tales of Wells Fargo
"The Bounty Hunter" (1959) as Jeff Briscoe
"The Trading Post" (1960) as Robson
Laramie
"Men of Defiance" (1960)
"Rimrock" (1961) as Rink Banners
"The Last Journey" (1961) as Damon Johntry
"War Hero" (1962) as Obie Loomis
Stagecoach West
"By the Deep Six" (1960) as Martin
"The Remounts" (1961) as Griz
"The Marker" (1961) as Mingo
Kraft Suspense Theatre
"In Darkness, Waiting: Part 1 and Part 2" (1965) as Victor Prelling
The Fugitive
"Smoke Screen" (1963) as Ranger Ritter
"Moon Child" (1965) as George Mangus
"Conspiracy of Silence" (1965) as Murchison
The Virginian
"Duel at Shiloh" (1963) as Deputy Bender
"Another's Footsteps" (1964) as Garrett
"Show Me a Hero" (1965) as  Bert Devlin
Daniel Boone
"The King's Shilling" (1967) as Andrew Hubbard
"Flag of Truce" (1968) as General Grosscup
Mission: Impossible
"The Frame" (1967) as Al Souchek
"The Seal" (1967) as William Conway
"Two Thousand" (1972) as Marshall
Ironside
"Girl in the Night" (1967) as Mike Hennessey
"The Machismo Bag" (1969) as Lieutenant Rambau
The Guns of Will Sonnett
"A Town in Terror: Pt 1 & Pt 2" (1969) as Ben Adams
Mannix
"You Can Get Killed Out There" (1968) as Al
"War of Nerves" (1970) as Hijacker

Single episode television appearances

Biff Baker, U.S.A. – "Crash Landing" (1952) as Soldier
Family Theatre  – "A Star Shall Rise" (1952) as Scribe
Gruen Guild Theater – "Girl from Kansas" (1952) as Boxcar Johnson
I Led Three Lives – "The Spy" (1953) as Comrade Straight
The Adventures of Kit Carson – Badman's Escape" (1953)
Hopalong Cassidy – "Arizona Troubleshooters" (1953) as George Byers
Rocky Jones, Space Ranger – Beyond the Curtain of Space (1954) as Ophician SoldierWaterfront  – "Captain for a Day" (1955) as DarbyCrusader – "The Farm" (1956) as HeinrichThe Man Behind the Badge – "The Case of the Unwelcome Stranger" (1955) as LloydTreasury Men in Action – "The Case of the Ready Guns" (1955) as Ben AdamsBig Town – "Shield of a Killer" (1955)The Lone Ranger – "Six-Gun Artist" (1955) as Lafe, Second ThugCavalcade of America – The Doll Who Found a Mother (1956)
You Are There – Decatur's Raid at Tripoli (February 16, 1804)  (1956)Sheriff of Cochise – "Fire on Chiricahua Mountains" (1956) as BarlettCrossroads – "Boom Town Padre" (1957) as Luke CassidyPanic!" – "The Subway" (1957) as Detective
Casey Jones – "Night Mail" (1957) as Mike Nelson
Broken Arrow – "Black Moment" (1957) as Halley
Zorro – "Garcia Stands Accused" (1958) as Lancer
Have Gun – Will Travel – "The Man Who Lost" (1959) as Ben Coey
The Alaskans – "Million Dollar Kid" (1960) as Wilkes
Law of the Plainsman – "The Gibbet" (1959) as Zeb Derkson
The Man from Blackhawk – "Station Six" (1959)
Bat Masterson – "Who'll Bury My Violence?" (1959) as Barney KasterWichita Town – "Man on the Hill" (1959) as Pete Bennett
The David Niven Show– Sticks and Stones (1959) as Police Lieutenant O'BrienThe Detectives Starring Robert Taylor – The Scalpel (1960) as Dr. BruceThe Aquanauts – Deep Escape (1960)
Dante – "Opening Night" (1960) as Lt. Robert MaloneMarkham – "13 Avenida Muerte" (1960) as Cal
Tate – "The Mary Hardin Story" (1960) as Tetlow
The Texan – "Thirty Hours to Kill" (1960) as Ben Dawson/Blackie Dawson
Shotgun Slade – "The Deadly Key" (1960) as Ben Wesley
Men into Space – "Shadows on the Moon" (1960) as Dr. George Coldwell
Pony Express – "Special Delivery" (1960) as Strobridge
Johnny Ringo – "Killer, Choose a Card" (1960) as Jed Matthews
Lawman – "Owny O'Reilly, Esq." (1961) as Jack Saunders
GE True – "The Black-Robed Ghost" (1963) as Det. John Duncan
The Wild Wild West – "The Night of the Casual Killer" (1965) as Chuck Harper
My Favorite Martian – "The Time Machine Is Waking Up That Old Gang of Mine" (1965) as Jesse James
 A Man Called Shenandoah  – "The Locket" (1965) as Sheriff
Bewitched – "Speak the Truth" (1965) as Traffic Policeman
Death Valley Days – "No Gun Behind His Badge" (1965) Whalen (with Ronald Reagan as Thomas J. Smith)
The Green Hornet – "Give 'Em Enough Rope" (1966) as Alex Colony
Laredo – "Finnegan" (1966) as Muldoon
The Iron Horse  – "Explosion at Waycrossing" (1966) as Sheriff Harkness
The Invaders – "Condition: Red" (1967) as Mr. Arius
Felony Squad – "The Death Bag" (1967) as Louie AntonidesMaya – "The Legend of Whitney Markham" (1968) as Frank Sanders
 The Outcasts – "They Shall Rise Up" (1969) as TauberThe Name of the Game – "A Wrath of Angels" (1969) as Berg JannsenLand of the Giants – "Home Sweet Home" (1969) as ConstableLancer – "The Rivals" (1970) as KlingAdam-12 (1971) as Luke NathanAlias Smith and Jones – "McGuffin" (1972) as First Man
 The Mod Squad – "Kill Gently, Sweet Jessie" (1972)The Streets of San Francisco – "Deathwatch" (1973) as Victor W. Snyder (final appearance)

Theatrical filmsAffair in Trinidad (1952) as Martin, Wittol's HenchmanNo Holds Barred (1952) as Second Mug (uncredited)The Juggler (1953) as Policeman (uncredited)The Farmer Takes a Wife (1953) as Floyd (uncredited)Hannah Lee: An American Primitive (1953) as Doctor (uncredited)Texas Bad Man (1953) as BartenderThe Wild One (1953) as Deputy (uncredited)It Should Happen to You (1954) as Photographer (uncredited)Drive a Crooked Road (1954) as Garage Foreman (uncredited)Pushover (film) (1954) as Second Bartender (uncredited)A Star Is Born (1954) as Makeup Man (uncredited)Cry Vengeance (1954) as Johnny Blue-EyesJupiter's Darling (1955) as Hannibal's Guard (uncredited)Dial Red O (1955) as Newspaper Photographer (uncredited)The Naked Street (1955) as Finney (uncredited)To Hell and Back (1955) as Soldier in Bunk (uncredited)The Marauders (1955) as CarmackTrial (1955) as Reporter (uncredited)Desert Sands (1955) as Woloack, Radio Man Ransom! (1956) as Service Man (uncredited)The Harder They Fall (1956) as Reporter in Hospital (uncredited)Crashing Las Vegas (1956) as OggyTension at Table Rock (1956) as Deputy Sheriff (uncredited)The Shadow on the Window (1957) as Myra's Husband (uncredited)The Iron Sheriff (1957) as Range Detective SutherlandMan in the Shadow (1957) as Empire Ranch Gateman Bill EdmundsBombers B-52 (1957) as Sergeant addressing Flyers (uncredited)Touch of Evil (1958) as Al Schwartz, District Attorney's AssistantRide a Crooked Trail (1958) as PecosPsycho (1960) as Highway Patrol OfficerTwenty Plus Two (1961) as Harbin (uncredited)Gunfight at Comanche Creek (1963) as Ben BadyThe Quick Gun (1964) as Cagle Bullet for a Badman (1964) as Ira SnowWhere Love Has Gone (1964) as Petey Peterson (uncredited)The Outlaws Is Coming (1965) as Trigger MortisBlindfold (1966) as HomburgTorn Curtain (1966) as FarmerReturn of the Gunfighter (1967) as Will ParkerThe Name of the Game Is Kill! (1968) as Sheriff Fred KendallStrategy of Terror (1969) as Victor PellingBreakout (1970) (TV) as MiddletonSoldier Blue'' (1970) as Sgt. O'Hearn

References

External links

 

1919 births
1993 deaths
American male film actors
American male television actors
Male actors from New York (state)
People from Ventura, California
20th-century American male actors
Western (genre) television actors
Jewish American male actors
20th-century American Jews